Huayta (possibly from Aymara for a headdress made of feathers or flowers, Quechua for crest; wild flower; the whistling of the wind) is a mountain in the Chila mountain range in the Andes of Peru, about  high . It is located in the Arequipa Region, Castilla Province, Chachas District. Huayta lies south of Huanca and Sullucullahua, northeast of Chinchón and southeast of Aceruta.

References

Mountains of Peru
Mountains of Arequipa Region